Salka Viertel (15 June 1889 – 20 October 1978) was an Austrian Jewish actress and Hollywood screenwriter. While under contract with Metro-Goldwyn-Mayer from 1933 to 1937, Viertel co-wrote the scripts for many movies, particularly those starring her close friend Greta Garbo, including Queen Christina (1933) and Anna Karenina (1935). She also played opposite Garbo in MGM's German-language version of Anna Christie in 1930.

Early life and career
Viertel was born Salomea Sara Steuermann in Sambor, a city then in the province of Galicia, which was a part of the Austro-Hungarian Empire, but today is in western Ukraine. Her father, Joseph Steuermann, was a lawyer and the mayor of Sambor before antisemitism forced him to renounce his office. Her mother, Auguste Steuermann, died in 1952 at Viertel's home in Santa Monica. Her siblings were the composer and pianist Eduard Steuermann; Rosa (Ruzia; 1891–1972), married from 1922 until her death to the actor and director Josef Gielen; and the Polish national football player Zygmunt Steuermann.

After debuting as Salome Steuermann at the Pressburg Stadttheater (regional theater), Viertel had engagements in typical spas of the Austro-Hungarian Empire. In 1911 she played briefly under Max Reinhardt in Berlin, whereupon she followed an offer in 1913 to go to Vienna to work on the Neue Wiener Bühne. There she met her husband, author and director Berthold Viertel, and they married in 1918. They raised three sons—Hans, Peter, and Thomas—before divorcing in 1947. In 1920, Salka Viertel went to Hamburg to the Great Theater, later to Düsseldorf. Her husband worked from 1920 in Berlin, where he founded the collective theatre "Die Troupe" and worked for UFA, the major German film production company.

The Viertels were part of “Hitler’s gift to America,” according to one biographer, since so many film artists throughout Europe and the German-speaking artistic community  in particular fled his regime, including, notably, fellow Austrian writer Vicki Baum. As was the case with US universities in the 1930s, Saunders notes that Hollywood studios could be so selective "that the list of emigres reads almost as a who's who of Weimar production"; he places Berthold Viertel as "only marginally less significant" than other emigres whom he considers "without peer."  In 1928, at FW Murnau's instigation, the family went to Hollywood, where Berthold Viertel received a contract with Fox Film Corporation as a director and writer.

Despite her success on German and Austrian stages, Salka Viertel was only modestly successful as an actor in movies. Agreeing with Max Reinhardt, whom the Viertels ran into in New York on their way to Los Angeles, Viertel herself said she was "neither pretty nor young enough" for a career in film. One of her most successful roles was Marthy in the German version of Anna Christie, which she took over at the request of Garbo (it was originally intended for Marie Dressler). She became a mentor and friend to Greta Garbo and contributed to scripts for the famous actress for such films as Queen Christina, Anna Karenina, and Two-Faced Woman. However, the plan to write a commercial script for Hollywood together with Bertolt Brecht, who also lived in exile in the United States, failed.

Social activism
The Viertels, members of the intelligentsia in Europe, moved to the United States in 1928 for a planned four-year stay. The Viertels initially lived on Fairfax Avenue in Los Angeles, before renting a house on Mabery Road in Santa Monica, California. 

In 1932, following Hitler's rise, they decided to stay in Santa Monica, where their sons grew up. Their home in Santa Monica Canyon was the site of salons and meetings of the Hollywood intelligentsia and the émigré community of European intellectuals, particularly at their Sunday night tea parties. Her guests included not only Sergei Eisenstein and Charlie Chaplin but also Arnold Schoenberg, Christopher Isherwood (who moved into Viertel's garage apartment with his boyfriend in 1946), Hanns Eisler, Bertolt Brecht, Max Reinhardt, and Thomas Mann. Brecht met Charles Laughton at her house, where Ava Gardner was also a guest.

Viertel not only acted as a diplomat among the politically diverse emigré community but often played a practical role as a go-between among the emigré and Hollywood communities. She actively fundraised for Eisenstein's Que Viva Mexico! project. Composer Franz Waxman met director James Whale through her and wrote his first Hollywood soundtrack for Whale. Charles Boyer was among those whom she helped gain a foothold within the Hollywood film industry. 

In the 1930s and 1940s, while fighting against National Socialism, she came to the aid of those trapped in Europe, in part by helping to found the European Film Fund, which brokered contracts with major Hollywood studios. Through the Fund's assistance, notable artists such as Leonhard Frank, Heinrich Mann, Alfred Polgar, Walter Mehring, and Friedrich Torberg received emergency visas that enabled them to escape the Nazis. Viertel also helped such emigrés "find their footing when they arrived." Ross goes so far as to write that "Weimar on the Pacific might never have existed without her."

With the onset of the Cold War and the McCarthy era, Viertel was among the Hollywood writers suspected of being communists who were blacklisted. As a result of government hostility raised by unfounded allegations of communism, she was denied a passport. Eventually she was granted a temporary one, but it arrived too late for her to travel to Europe to see her dying ex-husband before his death.

Later life
After her divorce in 1947, Salka lived in Brentwood, Southern California. In 1953 she left the U.S. and settled in Klosters in Switzerland, where later her son Peter and his second wife, actress Deborah Kerr, lived.

In 1969, her autobiography, The Kindness of Strangers, was published; it was reissued in 2019.

Salka Viertel died in Klosters, Switzerland, on 20 October 1978, aged 89.

Selected filmography
Actress
Seven Faces (1929) as Catherine the Great
Anna Christie (1930, German-language version) as Marty Owens
The Mask Falls (1931)
The Sacred Flame (1931)
Screenwriter
Queen Christina (1933)
The Painted Veil (1934)
Anna Karenina (1935)
Conquest (1937)
Two-Faced Woman (1941)
Deep Valley (1947)
Loves of Three Queens (1954)
Prisoner of the Volga (1958)

Bibliography
 Carola Bebermeier. (2021) "Sundays at Salka’s" – Salka Viertel’s Los Angeles Salon as a Space of (Music-)Cultural Translation, in: Musicologia Austriaca: Journal for Austrian Music Studies, Juni 2021, https://musau.org/parts/neue-article-page/view/113.
 SateLIT 2: Salka Vietel. Berlin - Hollywood (2021). Exhibition Stiftung Brandenburger Tor im Max Liebermann Haus, Berlin. September 8 to November 21, 2021.
 Añó, Núria. (2020) The Salon of Exiled Artists in California: Salka Viertel took in actors, prominent intellectuals and anonymous people in exile fleeing from Nazism, Los Gatos: Smashwords.
 Prager, Katharina. (2007) "Ich bin nicht gone Hollywood!" Salka Viertel – Ein Leben in Theater und Film, Wien: Braumüller Verlag.
Nottelmann, Nicole. (2011) Ich liebe dich. Fur immer: Greta Garbo und Salka Viertel. Berlin: Aufbau Verlag.

References

External links

 A webpage about Salka Viertel with images
 Photographs of Viertel and her siblings; mainly of her brother Eduard Steuermann

1889 births
1978 deaths
Jews from Galicia (Eastern Europe)
American people of Austrian-Jewish descent
People from Sambir
Austrian screenwriters
American women screenwriters
American people of Ukrainian-Jewish descent
Austrian emigrants to the United States
American emigrants to Switzerland
Jewish American screenwriters
20th-century American women writers
20th-century American screenwriters
American salon-holders